Kiltybegs is a townland in County Monaghan, Republic of Ireland.

References

Townlands of County Monaghan